Jean-Claude Marcourt (16 October 1956) has been, since 2019, the President of the Parliament of Wallonia. He was the Vice-Minister-President and Minister of Economy and Foreign Affairs of the Walloon government, and Vice-Minister-President and Minister of Higher Education of the Government of the French Community. He is member of the Belgian Francophone Socialist Party (PS).

External links
 
 
 Marcourt as minister in the government
 Blog of Marcourt

1956 births
Living people
People from Awans
Government ministers of Wallonia
Socialist Party (Belgium) politicians
Walloon people
Walloon movement activists